Occella is a genus of poachers native to the northern Pacific Ocean.

Species
There are currently four recognized species in this genus:
 Occella dodecaedron (Tilesius, 1813) (Bering poacher)
 Occella iburia (D. S. Jordan & Starks, 1904)
 Occella kasawae (D. S. Jordan & C. L. Hubbs, 1925)
 Occella kuronumai (Freeman, 1951)

References

Brachyopsinae
 
Marine fish genera
Taxa named by David Starr Jordan
Taxa named by Carl Leavitt Hubbs